Packet over SONET/SDH, abbreviated POS,  is a communications protocol for transmitting packets in the form of the Point to Point Protocol (PPP) over SDH or SONET, which are both standard protocols for communicating digital information using lasers or light emitting diodes (LEDs) over optical fibre at high line rates. POS is defined by RFC 2615 as PPP over SONET/SDH. PPP is the Point to Point Protocol that was designed as a standard method of communicating over point-to-point links. Since SONET/SDH uses point-to-point circuits, PPP is well suited for use over these links. Scrambling is performed during insertion of the PPP packets into the SONET/SDH frame to solve various security attacks including denial-of-service attacks and the imitation of SONET/SDH alarms. This modification was justified as cost-effective because the scrambling algorithm was already used by the standard used to transport ATM cells over SONET/SDH. However, scrambling can optionally be disabled to allow a node to be compatible with another node that uses the now obsoleted RFC 1619 version of Packet over SONET/SDH which lacks the scrambler.

Applications of POS
The most important application of POS is to support sending of IP packets across wide area networks.  Large amounts of traffic on the Internet are carried over POS links. 
POS is also one of the link layers used by the Resilient Packet Ring standard known as IEEE 802.17.

History of POS
Cisco was involved in making POS an important wide area network protocol.  PMC-Sierra produced an important series of early semiconductor devices which
implemented POS.

Details about the name "POS"
POS (packet over SONET) is a double-nested abbreviation. The S represents "SONET/SDH", which itself stands for "Synchronous Optical Network/Synchronous Digital Hierarchy".
Given this information, POS technically stands for "Packet over Synchronous Optical Network/Synchronous Digital Hierarchy".

Complementary Interfaces
The System Packet Interface series of standards from the Optical Internetworking Forum including SPI-4.2 and SPI-3 and their predecessors PL-4 and PL-3 are commonly used as the interface between packet processing devices and framer devices that implement POS.  The acronym PL-4 means POS-PHY Layer 4.

See also 
 Ethernet over SONET

Network protocols
Synchronous optical networking